A Roda is one of four parishes (administrative divisions) in Tapia de Casariego, a municipality within the province and autonomous community of Asturias, in northern Spain. As of 2018, the population was 187, with 90 males & 97 females living in the parish.

Towns 
 A Barrosa
 Acebedo
 As Fonsarias
 Bustello
 Llantrapiñán
 Matafoyada
 El Monte
 Mumián
 Orxales
 Reiriz
 Riocabo
 A Roda
 San Xuyán
 El Valle de San Agustín
 A Veguía
 Villarín
 Xarias

References

Parishes in Tapia de Casariego